Happy Holidays from Drive-Thru Records is a compilation album, released on December 14, 2004, of Christmas-themed songs by Drive-Thru Records and Rushmore Records artists. All the recordings were previously unreleased, though five of the eight songs were cover versions of famous Christmas tunes. In December 2004, the album was available exclusively at Drive-Thru Records' website for online purchase. The limited print run of 1,200 copies sold out before the end of the year. It was then sold digitally at online music stores, such as Sony Connect.

Hidden in Plain View's "Christmas Song" (which both musically and lyrically pays homage to Jimmy Eat World's "Goodbye Sky Harbor") was on the original soundtrack to The Ice Harvest the following year.

Track listing
 "Feliz Navidad" (Jose Feliciano) performed by Home Grown – 2:59
 "Here Lies Our Holiday" (Day at the Fair) performed by Day at the Fair – 3:14
 "Alone on Christmas" (Steven van Zandt) performed by Self Against City – 3:47
 "Winter Wonderland" (Felix Bernard, Richard B. Smith) performed by Hellogoodbye – 1:54
 "War Is Over" (John Lennon) performed by An Angle – 3:51
 "Christmas Song" (Hidden in Plain View) performed by Hidden in Plain View – 3:08
 "Have Yourself a Merry Little Christmas" (Ralph Blane, Hugh Martin) performed by The Track Record – 2:55
 "Rites of Winter" (Jenoah) performed by Jenoah – 4:11

Record label compilation albums
Christmas compilation albums
2004 Christmas albums
2004 compilation albums
Drive-Thru Records compilation albums